Konstantinovo may refer to:
Konstantinovo, Burgas Province, a village in Burgas Province, Bulgaria
Konstantinovo, Haskovo Province, a village in Haskovo Province, Bulgaria
Konstantinovo, Varna Province, a village in Varna Province, Bulgaria
Konstantinovo, Russia, several rural localities in Russia